This is a list of the number ones of the Official Subscription Plays Chart.

List of Official Subscription Plays Chart number-one songs of the 2000s
List of Official Subscription Plays Chart number-one songs of the 2010s

See also
List of UK Dance Chart number-one singles
List of UK Indie Chart number-one singles
List of UK Rock Chart number-one singles
List of UK R&B Chart number-one singles

External links
Digital Plays Chart at the Official Charts Company

Subscription Plays